WHKC (91.5 MHz) is a non-profit FM radio station in Columbus, Ohio.  It is owned by Christian Broadcasting Services and airs a Christian talk and teaching radio format, calling itself "Freedom FM."  National religious leaders heard on WHKC include Dr. Charles Stanley, Alistair Begg, Joyce Meyer, David Jeremiah, Adrian Rogers and Jim Daly.

History
On , the station first signed on the air.  According to FCC filings,, Robert Casagrande, the President of Christian Broadcasting Services, died on October 13, 2007.  His widow replaced him in that position and the FCC was notified of additional changes in the composition of the board of directors of the corporation.

External links
Station website

 Columbus Dispatch Article
 Station Play Log

HKC
Moody Radio affiliate stations
Radio stations established in 2006
HKC